Thomas Rostron (birth year unknown), also known by the nickname "Tommy", is an English former professional rugby league footballer who played in the 1940s.

International honours
Tommy Rostron won a cap for England while at Oldham in 1945 against Wales.

References

External links
Statistics at orl-heritagetrust.org.uk

England national rugby league team players
English rugby league players
Oldham R.L.F.C. players
Rugby league locks
Year of birth missing
Possibly living people